The rugby sevens competitions at the 2017 Southeast Asian Games in Kuala Lumpur took place at the Petaling Jaya Stadium in Petaling Jaya.

The 2017 edition featured competitions in two events.

Competition schedule

Participating nations

Men's tournament

Women's tournament

Men's competition

Group stage

Final round

Women's competition

Group stage

Final round

Medal summary

Medal table

Medalists

References

External links